The Hansa-Brandenburg W.17 was a German flying boat fighter of the World War I era, designed and built by Hansa-Brandenburg.

Design and development
Two W.17 prototypes were built for the Austro-Hungarian Navy. The first prototype (A49/I) was a biplane with a cantilever lower wing, while the second prototype (A 49/II) was a triplane with interplane bracing struts. Armament consisted of two  Schwarzlose machine guns. Gottfried Banfield, who oversaw evaluation of the W.17, judged the aircraft unsuitable for service due to its poor maneuverability. The second W.17, meanwhile, was evaluated by the Austro-Hungarian Navy in July 1917 but was not ordered into production.

See also

References

Bibliography

Further reading
 

1910s German fighter aircraft
Flying boats
W.17
Single-engined tractor aircraft
Biplanes
Triplanes
Aircraft first flown in 1917